Brooks H. Pate is the William R. Kenan, Jr. Professor of Chemistry at the University of Virginia.

He graduated from the University of Virginia with a B.S. in Chemistry in 1987, and from Princeton University with a Ph.D. in 1992.  He was a NRC Postdoctoral Fellow at NIST (Gaithersburg, MD) from 1992 to 1993.  He heads the Pate Research Group.

Awards
 2016 William F. Meggers Award in Spectroscopy
2016 Herty Medal
 2008 Fellow of the American Physical Society
 2001 MacArthur Fellows Program
 1999 Coblentz Award
 1998 Camille Dreyfus Teacher Scholar

Works
"Distinguishing Tunneling Pathways for Two Chiral Conformer Pairs of 1,3-Propanediol from the Microwave Spectrum". Plusquellic DF, Lovas FJ, Pate BH, Neill JL, Muckle MT, Remijan AJ. J Phys Chem A. October 13, 2009.
"Semiexperimental Equilibrium Structure for the C-6 Backbone of cis-1,3,5-Hexatriene; Structural Evidence for Greater pi-Electron Delocalization with Increasing Chain Length in Polyenes". Suenram RD, Pate BH, Lesarri A, Neill JL, Shipman S, Holmes RA, Leyden MC, Craig NC. J. Phys. Chem. A. 113, 1864-1868 (2009).
"Conformational isomerization kinetics of pent-1-en-4-yne with 3,330 cm(-1) of internal energy measured by dynamic rotational spectroscopy". Dian BC, Brown GG, Douglass KO, Rees FS, Johns JE, Nair P, Suenram RD, Pate BH. PNAS. 105, 12696-12700 (2008).
"Gas-phase conformational distributions for the 2-alkylalcohols 2-pentanol and 2-hexanol from microwave spectroscopy". Tubergen MJ, Conrad AR, Chavez RE, Hwang I, Suenram RD, Pajski JJ, Pate BH. J. Mol. Spec. 251, 330-338 (2008).
"A broadband Fourier transform microwave spectrometer based on chirped pulse excitation". Brown GG, Dian BC, Douglass KO, Geyer SM, Shipman ST, Pate BH. Review of Scientific Instruments. 79, 053103 (2008)

References

External links
"BH Pate", Google Scholar

21st-century American chemists
Living people
University of Virginia faculty
University of Virginia alumni
Princeton University alumni
MacArthur Fellows
Spectroscopists
Year of birth missing (living people)